The Joshua Jennison House is a historic house at located 11 Thornton Street in the Newton Corner village of Newton, Massachusetts.

Description and history 
The -story wood-frame house was built in the 1840s, and is an exceptional example of a modest Greek Revival house. The first floor area under the wraparound porch is flushboarded, and the front entry is flanked by sidelight windows and cornerboards. The house has pilastered corner boards and a full entablature. Houses of this type were once quite common in Newton.

The house was listed on the National Register of Historic Places on September 4, 1986.

See also
 National Register of Historic Places listings in Newton, Massachusetts

References

Houses on the National Register of Historic Places in Newton, Massachusetts
Houses completed in 1845
Greek Revival houses in Massachusetts